Yemashevo (Yamaş) is a rural locality (a selo) in Osinovsky Selsoviet, Birsky District, Bashkortostan, Russia. The population was 148 as of 2010. There are 8 streets. Is the birthplace of Zekeria Aknazarov.

Geography 
Yemashevo is located 27 km east of Birsk (the district's administrative centre) by road. Lezhebokovo is the nearest rural locality.

References 

Rural localities in Birsky District